Fred De Abel (4 May 1910 – 3 August 1976) was an  Australian rules footballer who played with Hawthorn in the Victorian Football League (VFL).

Notes

External links 

1910 births
1976 deaths
Australian rules footballers from Victoria (Australia)
Hawthorn Football Club players
Myrtleford Football Club players